The pilcrow, ¶, is a handwritten or typographical character used to identify a paragraph. It is also called the paragraph mark (or sign or symbol), paraph, or blind P.

The pilcrow may be used at the start of separate paragraphs or to designate a new paragraph in one long piece of copy, as Eric Gill did in his 1931 book An Essay on Typography. The pilcrow was a type of rubrication used in the Middle Ages to mark a new train of thought, before the convention of visually discrete paragraphs was commonplace. In some medieval texts, it indicated a new sentence. In recent times, the symbol has been given a wider variety of roles, as listed below.

The pilcrow is usually drawn similarly to a lowercase  reaching from descender to ascender height; the bowl (loop) can be filled or unfilled. It may also be drawn with the bowl stretching further downwards, resembling a reversed ; this is more often seen in older printing.

Origin and name 
The earliest reference of the modern 'pilcrow' is in 1440 with the Middle English word .

Use in Ancient Greek 
The first way to divide sentences into groups in Ancient Greek was the original , which was a horizontal line in the margin to the left of the main text. As the  became more popular, the horizontal line eventually changed into the Greek letter Gamma and later into , which were enlarged letters at the beginning of a paragraph.

Use in Latin 
Above notation soon changed to the letter , an abbreviation for the Latin word , which translates as "head", i.e. it marks the head of a new thesis. Eventually, to mark a new section, the Latin word , which translates as "little head", was used, and the letter  came to mark a new section, or chapter,  in 300 BC.

Use in Middle Ages 
In the 1100s,  had completely replaced  as the symbol for a new chapter.

(Scribes would often leave space before paragraphs to allow rubricators to add a hand-drawn pilcrow in contrasting ink. With the introduction of the printing press from the late medieval period on, space before paragraphs was still left for rubricators to complete by hand. However in some circumstances, rubricators could not draw fast enough for publishers' deadlines and books would often be sold with the beginnings of the paragraphs left blank. This is how the practice of indention before paragraphs was created.)

Modern use 

The pilcrow remains in use in modern time in the following ways:

 in legal writing, it is often used whenever one cites a specific paragraph within pleadings, law review articles, statutes, or other legal documents and materials;
 in academic writing, it is sometimes used as an in-text referencing tool to make reference to a specific paragraph from a document that does not contain page numbers, allowing the reader to find where that particular idea or statistic was sourced. The pilcrow sign followed by a number indicates the paragraph number from the top of the page. It is rarely used when citing books or journal articles;
 in web publishing style guides, a pilcrow may be used to indicate an anchor link;
 in proofreading, it indicates an instruction that one paragraph should be split into two or more separate paragraphs. The proofreader inserts the pilcrow at the point where a new paragraph should begin;
 in some high-church Anglican and Episcopal churches, it is used in the printed order of service to indicate that instructions follow; these indicate when the congregation should stand, sit, and kneel, who participates in various portions of the service, and similar information. King's College, Cambridge uses this convention in the service booklet for the Festival of Nine Lessons and Carols. This is analogous to the writing of these instructions in red in some rubrication conventions.

The pilcrow is used in desktop publishing software such as desktop word processors and page layout programs to mark the end of a paragraph. It is also used as the icon on a toolbar button that shows or hides the pilcrow and similar onscreen annotations that mark hidden characters, including tabs, whitespace, and page breaks. In typing programs, it marks a carriage return that one must type.

The pilcrow may indicate a footnote in a convention using a sequence of distinct typographic symbols in sequence to distinguish the footnotes on a given page; it is the sixth in a series of footnote symbols beginning with the asterisk.

Encoding 
The capitulum character is obsolete, being replaced by pilcrow, but is included in Unicode for backward compatibility and historic studies.

Historically, the pilcrow symbol was included in the default hardware codepage 437 of IBM PCs (and all other 8-bit OEM codepages based on this) at code point 20 (0x14), sharing its position with the ASCII control code DC4.

Keyboard entry 
 US international keyboard layout: 
 Classic Mac OS and macOS: 
 Linux: 
 Linux and ChromeOS:  (ChromeOS with UK-International keyboard layout)
 HTML:  (introduced in HTML 3.2 (1997)), or 
 Vim, in insert mode:       (upper-case i, not a digit 1 or a lower-case letter L)
 TeX: \P
 LaTeX: \P or \textpilcrow
 Android phones (Gboard): 
Apple iPhones and iPads may require additional software. Tools may be required to easily generate a pilcrow, or other special characters.

Depending on the font used, this character varies in appearance.

Paragraph signs in non-Latin writing systems 

In Thai, the character ๏ marks the beginning of a stanza and ฯะ or ๚ะ marks the end of a stanza.

In Sanskrit and other Indian languages, text blocks are commonly written in stanzas. Two vertical bars, ॥, called a 'double danda,' are the functional equivalent of a pilcrow.

In Amharic, the characters ፠ and ፨ can mark a section/paragraph.

In China, the 〇, which has been used as a zero character since the 12th century, has been used to mark paragraphs in older Western-made books such as the Chinese Union Version of the Bible.

References

External links 

Punctuation
Typographical symbols